Tomorrow is the only studio album by the English psychedelic rock band Tomorrow. It was originally released in 1968 by EMI Parlophone in the U.K. in a black and white sleeve.  A slightly different version of the album was also released in the U.S. in 1968 as Sire Records SES 97012, one of the first releases on that label.  Although it was not a success when it was first released, it is now widely regarded as one of the best psychedelic rock albums ever made.

The lack of commercial success can be explained by the long delay between initial recording sessions in spring 1967 and final release in February 1968.  By the time the album arrived in record stores the psychedelic trend had already begun to abate.  EMI provided a very small recording budget and would not allow prints of a colour album cover to be made, although some later re-issues were printed with a modified colour cover.

Mark Smotroff of Audiophile Reviews called the album "a knockout lost classic".

Track listing
All songs written by Keith West and Ken Burgess except where noted.

Note: Keith West's songwriting credits are as Keith Hopkins (his real name).

Side one
"My White Bicycle" – 3:18
"Colonel Brown" – 2:53
"Real Life Permanent Dream" (Hopkins) – 3:17
"Shy Boy" – 2:27
"Revolution" (Hopkins, Steve Howe) – 3:51
Side two
"The Incredible Journey of Timothy Chase" (Hopkins) – 3:19
"Auntie Mary's Dress Shop" – 2:47
"Strawberry Fields Forever" (Lennon/McCartney) – 4:00
"Three Jolly Little Dwarfs" – 2:28
"Now Your Time Has Come" (Hopkins) – 4:54
"Hallucinations" – 2:43

Personnel
Tomorrow
Keith West – vocals
Steve Howe – guitar
John "Junior" Wood – bass
John "Twink" Alder – drums
Additional musician
Mark P. Wirtz – organ, piano
Production
Mark P. Wirtz with engineers: Geoff Emerick, Peter Bown*

1976 Harvest edition
In 1976, Harvest Records (another EMI label) re-issued the album as part of its Harvest Heritage series, with catalogue number SHSM-2010.  This edition features a new colour cover which states in large letters on the front: "featuring Keith West and Steve Howe".  It includes an extra track as the second-last on side one:
"Claramount Lake" (Hopkins, Burgess) – 3:02 (b-side of "My White Bicycle")

1999 CD reissue bonus tracks
In 1999, EMI released a CD (EMI 4988192) with additional tracks by Aquarian Age (band members Twink and Junior) and singer Keith West. "Why" is a cover of a song by The Byrds that originally appeared as the B-side to their single "Eight Miles High".

"Claramount Lake" (Hopkins, Burgess) – 3:02 (b-side of "My White Bicycle")
"Real Life Permanent Dream" – 2:24 (studio demo recording)
"Why" (McGuinn/Crosby) – 3:59 (studio demo recording)
"Revolution" – 3:50 (phased mono version, studio demo recording)
"Now Your Time Has Gone" – 3:05
"10,000 Words In a Cardboard Box" (by Aquarian Age) – 3:27
"Good Wizard Meets Naughty Wizard" (by Aquarian Age) – 4:42
"Me" (by Aquarian Age) – 3:12
"On a Saturday" (Keith West solo) – 3:13
"The Kid Was a Killer" (Keith West solo) – 2:31
"She" (Keith West solo) – 2:30
"The Visit" (Keith West solo) – 4:05

Personnel
Keith West solo tracks:
Steve Howe – guitar
Ronnie Wood – bass
Aynsley Dunbar – drums

References

1968 albums
Parlophone albums
EMI Records albums
Harvest Records albums
Tomorrow (band) albums
Sire Records albums